Börngen is a German surname. Notable people with the surname include:

Ernst Börngen (1916–1989), German Luftwaffe ace
Freimut Börngen (1930–2021), German astronomer

See also
3859 Börngen, main-belt asteroid

German-language surnames